Hajji Bijar va Jas Ganas (also Romanized as Ḩājjī Bījār va Jās Ganas; also known as Ḩājjī Bījār) is a village in Shanderman Rural District, Shanderman District, Masal County, Gilan Province, Iran. At the 2006 census, its population was 45, in 9 families.

References 

Populated places in Masal County